Mannofield is an affluent area of Aberdeen, Scotland. It is situated in the west end of the city and is accessible by travelling through the A93 Aberdeen–Perth road, the A90 Edinburgh to Fraserburgh road and the A96 (via the A90). Mannofield is also a short walking distance away from Aberdeen City Centre and has good road and bus links to the city and beyond. Much of Aberdeen's water is supplied by the water works/reservoir on St John's Terrace and the reservoir on Craigton Road.

History 
Robert Balmanno purchased part of the Aberdeen "Freedom Lands", formerly known as the Foul Moors, from the Rubislaw Estate in 1772 and proceeded to drain the marshy tract for farmland. His strawberries were said to be the best of the Scottish crop, and sold in Covent Garden in London. He built a large home, Friendville, near the edge of his estate (at Countesswells Road). A small community grew at the perimeter of Balmanno's Field, or Enclosure, the name thereafter evolving to Mannofield.

Education 
Mannofield is served in the primary sector by Airyhall Primary School, Broomhill Primary School and Cults Primary School. Secondary education is provided by Cults Academy, Harlaw Academy and Hazlehead Academy.

Cricket 
Mannofield has been the home of Aberdeenshire Cricket Club since 9 May 1890, with the club playing at Mannofield Park. The ground has been host to many great cricketing names over the years, most notably Sir Donald Bradman, who scored his last first class century on British soil at the ground in 1948. In the modern era the ground has become one of Scotland's finest and has the ability to stage One Day International games between nations.

Scout group 
Mannofield's local scout group is the 9th Aberdeen and local Explorer Group is Mannofield Explorers – in addition to the 1st City of Aberdeen Scout Troop on Forest Avenue Lane.

References

External links 
 Map of Mannofield

Areas of Aberdeen